Herbert Mies (23 February 1929 – 14 January 2017) was a German politician. He joined the Communist Party of Germany in 1945. Mies was elected chairman of the (West) German Communist Party in 1973. He was awarded the Lenin Peace Prize in 1985/1986. Mies resigned from his position as party chairman in October 1989.

Mies died on 14 January 2017 in his hometown of Mannheim at the age of 87.

References

1929 births
2017 deaths
German Communist Party politicians
Lenin Peace Prize recipients